I.E.M. is the debut album of Steven Wilson's side project, Incredible Expanding Mindfuck. The original 1996 vinyl edition on Chromatic Records was limited to 500 copies. An expanded CD edition was released by Delerium Records in 1998.

The album was also included in the 2010 Complete I.E.M, CD boxset where it reverted to the original vinyl track listing.

Track listing
All tracks written by Steven Wilson.
"The Gospel According to the I.E.M." – 12:56
"The Last Will and Testament of Emma Peel" – 8:08
"Fie Kesh" – 8:23
"Deafman" – 9:01
"Headphone Dust" – 6:18 (1998 CD version only)

Credits

I.E.M.
Steven Wilson - all instruments

See also 
List of ambient music artists

References

External links 
I.E.M. reviews and MP3 @ progarchives.com retrieved 7-11-07

1996 debut albums
Incredible Expanding Mindfuck albums